Elisabeth Finant (9 November 1954 – 28 September 1994), known professionally as Abeti Masikini, was a singer from the Belgian Congo who was active in France from 1971 until her death in 1994 at the age of 39. Her music pulled from a variety of genres, including soukous, Congolese rumba, folk music, and the blues. She recorded 21 albums during her career for a variety of record labels including RCA Records and Polygram Records among others.

Biography 
Masikini was born on 9 November 1954 in Stanleyville, Belgian Congo as a daughter of politician Jean-Pierre Finant. She died on 28 September 1994 in Villejuif, France, from cancer.

Bibliography

References

1954 births
1994 deaths
20th-century French women singers
Belgian Congo people
20th-century Democratic Republic of the Congo women singers
People from Val-de-Marne
People from Kisangani
Soukous musicians
French folk singers
French blues singers